Phthiotis and Phocis Prefecture was a prefecture of Greece. It was first established in 1833 as the Phocis and Locris Prefecture (Νομός Φθιώτιδος και Λοκρίδος) but abolished in 1836 and reconstituted in 1845 under its later name. At the time, it lay on the Greek-Ottoman border. With the annexation of Thessaly by Greece in 1881, the prefecture's territory came to include the Domokos Province. The prefecture was split up into separate Phthiotis and Phocis prefectures in the 1899 reform, but this was reverted in 1909. The prefecture finally ceased to exist in 1943, when it was again split up into Phthiotis and Phocis. These existed until the abolition of the prefectures in 2011, when they were transformed into regional units of the Central Greece region.

1845 establishments in Greece
States and territories established in 1845
States and territories disestablished in 1947
Prefectures of Greece
History of Central Greece